L'arca di Noè(Italian, 'Noah's Ark') is an album by the Italian singer-songwriter Franco Battiato. It was released in 1982 by EMI Italiana. During the first weeks of 1983 Battiato sold about 550,000 copies of L'arca di Noè.

Reception 
An article in the Italian newspaper La Stampa accused Battiato of enclosing in the LP the "culture of the new right", referring in particular to the first song of the album, "Radio Varsavia".

Track listing 
"Radio Varsavia"
"Clamori"
"L'esodo"
"Scalo a Grado"
"La torre"
"New Frontiers"
"Voglio vederti danzare"

Sources

References

See also 
Franco Battiato
Noah's Ark

1982 albums
Franco Battiato albums
Italian-language albums